Dirksland is a village and former municipality on Goeree-Overflakkee Island in the western Netherlands, in the province of South Holland. The former municipality had a population of about 8,000 in 2007, and covered an area of about 74 km² of which about 19 km² was water. The former municipality of Dirksland also included the communities of Herkingen, and Melissant. On 1 January 2013, Dirksland merged with Goedereede, Middelharnis, and Oostflakkee into the new municipality of Goeree-Overflakkee.

The North Sea flood of 1953 did not have as much of a destructive effect on Dirksland as the rest of the island, because Dirksland is somewhat higher. Dirksland is the largest of the three communities within the former municipality and also has the only hospital on Goeree-Overflakkee island. The Van Weel-Bethesda Hospital is one of the smallest in the country, but has an excellent reputation. Dirksland can be recognized from a distance by the tallest water tower in the country. The towns are agriculturally focused and have several campgrounds for people who prefer a bit of rest over the busy Ouddorp area but still want to be close to shore. Dirksland has an inland harbor with a newly restored gate complex.

Gallery

References

External links
 History of Dirksland

Municipalities of the Netherlands disestablished in 2013
Former municipalities of South Holland
Populated places in South Holland
Goeree-Overflakkee